Hydroxynitrile lyase may refer to:
 hydroxynitrilase, an enzyme
 (S)-hydroxynitrile lyase, an enzyme